Robert Smedley (born 28 November 1973) is a British automotive engineer who works for the organizers of Formula One motor racing after several years working within the Williams, Ferrari and Jordan Formula One teams.

Biography
Smedley was born and lived in Normanby, near Middlesbrough, until he was 18. He attended St Peter's School in South Bank and St Mary's Sixth Form College. At Loughborough University he achieved a Bachelor of Science in Mathematics and Mechanical Engineering followed by a Master's degree in Mechanical Engineering.

After leaving university, Smedley started work with Pilbeam Racing Designs, designing suspension elements used on the Peugeot 406 campaigned in the 1997 British Touring Car Championship. He went on to work on Formula 3000 cars and Williams touring cars before moving to Jordan Grand Prix at the start of 1999.

At Jordan he worked as a data acquisition engineer, responsible for telemetry data used by the team's race engineer and for the 2002 and 2003 seasons became a track engineer for the team. Before the 2004 Formula One season he moved to Ferrari where he initially worked in the test team. 

In the middle of the 2006 season, he replaced Gabriele Delli Colli as Felipe Massa's race engineer. Almost immediately Massa's form improved; his previously common errors became less frequent, and in August 2006, Massa took his first Formula One pole position and victory at the Turkish Grand Prix. Smedley is noted for his very frank and occasionally humorous radio transmissions to Massa. This includes at the 2009 Malaysian Grand Prix when he was heard clearly saying "Felipe baby, stay cool" after Massa was complaining about not having a clear visor for the wet race which was being restarted.

Following Massa's injury at the 2009 Hungarian Grand Prix, Smedley carried on with the role of race engineer for stand-in drivers Luca Badoer and Giancarlo Fisichella as they took over Massa's seat for the remainder of the 2009 season. Smedley had previously worked with Fisichella at Jordan.

Smedley was involved in an incident at the 2010 German Grand Prix in which the Ferrari team were found to have breached regulations regarding team orders. As Massa was in the lead of the race Smedley contacted him by radio and said "Fernando is faster than you. Can you confirm you understood that message?", a thinly veiled instruction to allow Alonso to pass him to win, which Massa duly complied with. Following the pass on lap 49 Smedley added 'OK mate good lad, stick with him now, sorry.' After the race Ferrari were fined $100,000 for the team orders, but the result was allowed to stand.

Smedley continued as Massa's race engineer at Ferrari and moved to Williams when Massa joined them from the 2014 season, heading the team's trackside operations. Smedley left Williams at the end of the 2018 season, one year after Massa had left Formula One.

Smedley was awarded an honorary degree ("Doctor of Professional Studies") from Teesside University in 2009. In July 2015 he was also awarded an honorary Doctor of Technology from Loughborough University in recognition of his outstanding contribution to Formula 1 and race engineering.

In 2020 Smedley started a low cost racing series (Total Karting, formerly named Electroheads Motorsport) using electric karts, aimed at making motorsport more accessible to beginners.

Career summary
1997–1998: suspension engineer –  Pilbeam Racing Designs
1999: engineer in the test team – Williams (BTCC)
2000: track engineer in Formula 3000
2001: data acquisition engineer – Jordan Grand Prix (F1)
2002–2003: track engineer – Jordan Grand Prix (F1)
2004–2005: engineer in the test team – Scuderia Ferrari (F1)
2006–2013: race engineer to Felipe Massa – Scuderia Ferrari (F1)
2014–2018: head of vehicle performance – Williams (F1)
2019–2020: expert technical consultant – Formula One Group
2020–present: Director of Data Systems – Formula One Group
2020–present: Founder and Owner – Total Karting (formerly named Electroheads Motorsport)

Personal life
Smedley is married to Lucy. They have two sons. They hold fundraising events on Teesside to support the Stillbirth and Neonatal Death Society (SANDS) after the death of their daughter Minnie in 2007. They are also patrons of Zöe's Place Baby Hospice, a charity for sick babies and young children.

References

1973 births
Living people
Ferrari people
Alumni of Loughborough University
Auto racing crew chiefs
British automotive engineers
English expatriates in Italy
People from Middlesbrough
Williams Grand Prix Engineering